Roderick Scott (born 27 December 1965) is a Canadian former soccer player and coach.

Club career

University of Akron
Scott attended the University of Akron on a soccer scholarship after a recruiter spotted him playing for the Canadian U-19 national team. He played on the Zips soccer team from 1985 to 1988. In 1986 Akron lost in Duke University in the NCAA championship. His senior season, he was a third team All-American.  He graduated in 1990 with a bachelor's degree in business and organizational communications.  He was inducted into the Akron Sports Hall of Fame in 2008.

Professional
In 1989, the Dallas Sidekicks of the Major Indoor Soccer League selected Scott in the first round (sixth overall) of the 1989 MISL Draft.  The Sidekicks competed in MISL until 1992. That year, Scott was a first team All Star.  In 1993, Scott and his teammates moved to the Continental Indoor Soccer League.  In 1994, he moved to the expansion Las Vegas Dustdevils. He suffered a career ending knee injury that season even as the Dustdevils won the CISL championship. He also played with the Kitchener in the CSL.

International career
He made his debut for Canada in a March 1993 friendly match against the USA and went on to earn a total of 5 caps, scoring no goals. He was included in Canada's 1993 CONCACAF Gold Cup squad, and his final international was an 8–0 demolition by Mexico at that tournament.

Coaching career
In 1996, he served as an assistant coach with the Sidekicks. In 2001, he became a staff coach with the Dallas Texans Soccer Club.  He has also coached Soccer Studio, a team in the Premier Arena Soccer League.

References

External links
 
 Dallas Sidekicks profile
 
 MISL stats

1965 births
Living people
Footballers from Greater London
English emigrants to Canada
Naturalized citizens of Canada
Black Canadian soccer players
Association football forwards
Canadian soccer players
Canadian expatriate soccer players
Canada men's youth international soccer players
Canada men's international soccer players
1993 CONCACAF Gold Cup players
Akron Zips men's soccer players
Dallas Sidekicks (original MISL) players
Las Vegas Dustdevils players
Canadian Soccer League (1987–1992) players
Major Indoor Soccer League (1978–1992) players
Continental Indoor Soccer League players
Expatriate soccer players in the United States
Canadian expatriate sportspeople in the United States
Kitchener Spirit players